The 2002 Seve Trophy golf tournament took place 19–21 April at Druids Glen, Newtownmountkennedy, County Wicklow, Ireland. The team captain for Great Britain and Ireland was Colin Montgomerie, with the captain for Continental Europe being Seve Ballesteros. The competition was won by Great Britain and Ireland.

Format 
The teams competed over three days with four greensomes matches and four foursomes matches on Friday, four fourball matches and four foursomes matches on Saturday and ten singles on Sunday.

Each member of the winner team received €150,000, the losing team €90,000 each, giving a total prize fund of €2,400,000.

Teams 
Both captains played and had one wild card selection each. The remaining 8 players in each team were the top 8 from the Seve Trophy points table, which started with the Open de Espana (19–22 April 2001) and which was finalised on 31 March 2002.

Oldcorn was a late replacement for David Howell.

Source:

Day one
Friday, 19 April 2002

Morning greensomes

Source:

Afternoon foursomes

Source:

Day two
Saturday, 20 April 2002

Morning fourball

Source:

Afternoon foursomes

Source:

Day three
Sunday, 21 April 2002

Singles

Source:

References

External links
Coverage on the European Tour's official site

Seve Trophy
Golf tournaments in the Republic of Ireland
Golf in Leinster
Sport in County Wicklow
Seve Trophy
Seve Trophy
Seve Trophy